Markus Wuckel (born 5 April 1967) is a German football manager and former player.

Playing career
Wuckel began his career in the youth teams of BSG Stahl Blankenburg and later joined Stahl Brandenburg, playing in the youth team until 1984. The following season, Wuckel played his first nine matches in the DDR-Oberliga, scoring once. After transferring to 1. FC Magdeburg for the 1985-86 season Wuckel quickly earned a reputation as a goal-getter. In his time in Magdeburg he played in 116 Oberliga matches, scoring 47 goals, twelve FDGB-Pokal matches (9 goals) and 2 matches in the UEFA Cup. When Magdeburg failed to qualify for a professional league following German reunification, Wuckel joined 1. SC Göttingen 05 who played in the then third-tier Oberliga Nord. He later played for several sides in the 2. Bundesliga such as VfB Oldenburg, Arminia Bielefeld, Rot-Weiss Essen und VfB Leipzig before he joined 1. FC Saarbrücken in 1997 where he ended his playing career in the following year.

Wuckel played in 125 DDR-Oberliga matches, scoring 48 goals, 43 2. Bundesliga matches with 7 goals and 74 matches in the Regionalliga with 24 goals. In the Oberliga he played 29 matches and scored 16 goals.

Additionally Wuckel played for his country in four matches, scoring twice. In addition he scored 11 goals in 24 matches for the East German Olympic team and another 11 goals in 28 matches for the Under-21 national team.

Post-playing career
After a management and marketing education Wuckel passed the manager seminar with the DFB. Afterwards he was director, manager and president of his home club Blankenburger FV, before managing 1. FC Wernigerode in the Verbandsliga Sachsen-Anhalt.

Today Wuckel owns a footballing school in Boltenhagen on the Baltic Sea and manages Arminia Bielefeld's women's team.

References

External links
 
 
 

1967 births
Living people
German footballers
East German footballers
Association football forwards
East Germany international footballers
1. FC Magdeburg players
VfB Oldenburg players
Arminia Bielefeld players
Rot-Weiss Essen players
1. FC Lokomotive Leipzig players
1. FC Saarbrücken players
DDR-Oberliga players